The Bay Area Segway Enthusiasts Group  held its first meeting on September 20, 2003, at the California FIRST Robotics Competition. The group was formed to increase knowledge and public acceptance of the Segway Human Transporter and to provide a resource to local owners and enthusiasts for information and group events. Not only was it one of the first Segway Enthusiasts Groups but it has become the largest and one of the most active. They are based in the San Francisco Bay Area.

In July 2004 members of the Bay Area SEG started playing Segway Polo. Group members have played around the United States and in New Zealand. Other teams are forming around the world.

Some notable members of Bay Area SEG are Steve Wozniak, Victor Miller and Amy Tan.

External links

Organizations based in the San Francisco Bay Area
2003 establishments in California
Culture in the San Francisco Bay Area
Science and technology in the San Francisco Bay Area